GNOME Recipes is a recipe management application for GNOME 3. It is being developed by Matthias Clasen who is known for his work on GTK, Wayland support for GNOME, and other core projects. It replaces the aging Gourmet Recipe Manager.

GNOME Recipes is a collaborative application with a database of recipes that is built up through developer and user contributions.

Features
 Start Cooking: Full screen step by step instructions, with a stop watch for cooking and baking times
 Buy ingredients & Shopping list
 Classification by Cuisine including American, Chinese, Indian, Middle Eastern, etc. 
 Classification by special occasions such as Thanksgiving or Christmas

References

GNOME Applications
Cooking websites